The 1980 Argentine Grand Prix was a Formula One motor race held on 13 January 1980 at the Autodromo Municipal Ciudad de Buenos Aires in Argentina. It was the opening round of the 1980 Formula One season. The race was the 16th Argentine Grand Prix and the sixth to be held on the #15 variation of the Buenos Aires circuit.

The race was won by Australian driver Alan Jones driving a Williams FW07. It was Jones' sixth World Championship victory. Jones won by 24 seconds over Brazilian driver Nelson Piquet driving a Brabham BT49. It was a prelude of the season to come, as Jones and Piquet would fight out the 1980 season. Another future world champion, Finnish driver Keke Rosberg, finished third driving a Fittipaldi F7.

Summary 
This race was additionally notable for the drivers threatening to boycott the event because of the appalling state of the track, which was breaking up in many spots in the infield thanks to the intense heat of a Buenos Aires summer. 

The immense grip of the aerodynamic suction created by the ground effect technology and the cars' tyres  and a battle between Gilles Villeneuve (Ferrari 312T5), Alan Jones, Jacques Laffite (Ligier JS11/15) and Nelson Piquet, made even more exciting due to the break-up of the track surface. Piquet finished second, Laffite retired with a blown engine and Villeneuve crashed going through the fast Tobogán complex due to a front suspension failure, although this was most likely exacerbated by a number of times he went off the very slippery track onto the sometimes bumpy and grassy run off area and consistently riding up the apex curbs of the Buenos Aires Autodrome.

The grass took out home favorite Carlos Reutemann (who had jumped into 5th at the start from 10th) in his first drive with Williams, who attempted to pass Piquet going into the Ascari chicane after the two mile flat out section. Reutemann slid off the track trying to pass Piquet on the outside of the Ascari chicane onto the grass run-off area. The two radiators in Reutemann's Williams FW07 sucked in grass and were both blocked, and the engines (already running at higher temperatures than normal) were even more prone to blowing up there in Buenos Aires because of the hot weather- a common problem at the Argentine Grand Prix. 

Multiple drivers spun off the track in the infield section, including Reutemann's teammate Jones, who had a short pitstop to clean his air intakes, but quickly returned to the battle. Reutemann also went into the pits to clean out his air intakes, but the damage was done and he retired with a blown engine soon after. Unsure if he would race again after 1980, the Argentinean was in fact so disconsolate that he sat motionless in his car for a few minutes, then got out of his car, sat on the track next to his car and burst into tears; the patriotic Reutemann had never won his home Grand Prix and would never do so.

The rate of attrition allowed Jody Scheckter into third place, but with just a handful of laps left suffered an engine failure in the Ferrari. This allowed Keke Rosberg to score his first ever podium in the same race as Piquet's first, and another future world champion Alain Prost (McLaren M29) scored a point on his Formula One début. It was a famous race of attrition on a terrible surface, where unusually the winner spun off twice and the runner-up once, and lap times were considerably slower than the previous year.

Classification

Qualifying

Race

Championship standings after the race

Drivers' Championship standings

Constructors' Championship standings

References

Argentine Grand Prix
Argentine Grand Prix
Grand Prix
Argentine Grand Prix